Karen Penglase (born 10 August 1982) is a Scottish female international football defender. She currently plays in the Scottish Women's Premier League for Rangers, having previously played for Kilmarnock, Hamilton Academical and Celtic. She has also played semi-professionally in Iceland with Grindavík and Keflavík. Penglase has represented the Scotland women's national football team at full international level.

Club career
Playing for Stenhousemuir in 1999–00, Penglase scored in a 9–0 Scottish Women's Cup final win over Clyde. In May 2002 Penglase joined Grindavík. After a spell with Kilmarnock, Penglase returned to Iceland in summer 2006, with Keflavík Football Club.

She signed for Celtic from Hamilton Academical in 2008.

After a spell playing and coaching in Australia in 2012, Penglase signed for Rangers for the 2013 Scottish Women's Premier League season under the management of her former Kilmarnock teammate Angie Hind.

International career
Penglase was first called up to the senior Scotland squad at the age of seventeen in 1999.

During Scotland's 2001 UEFA Women's Championship qualification campaign, Penglase scored in a fractious 4–1 win over Croatia at Forthbank Stadium in May 2000. She remained a regular pick throughout Scotland's 2003 World Cup qualifying fixtures.

Personal life
Penglase attended Reid Kerr College, studying for an HND in Sports Coaching and Development. She works as a lifeguard.

References

External links

1982 births
Living people
Scottish women's footballers
Scotland women's international footballers
Footballers from Glasgow
Celtic F.C. Women players
Rangers W.F.C. players
Expatriate women's footballers in Iceland
F.C. Kilmarnock Ladies players
Women's association football defenders
Karen Penglase
Karen Penglase
Hamilton Academical W.F.C. players
Scottish expatriate women's footballers